Monkton Combe Halt railway station was a railway station in Monkton Combe, Somerset, UK. It was built by the Great Western Railway in 1910, on the Camerton branch of the Bristol and North Somerset Railway line.

Operation

The Camerton branch had been built in 1882 from Hallatrow to Camerton, and extended in 1910 through Monkton Combe, where the station and level-crossing were built, to Limpley Stoke railway station, where it joined up with the line from Bath to Bradford-on-Avon railway station.

Passenger services started in 1910 and were suspended during the First World War on 22 March 1915; they resumed on 9 July 1923 ( though Midford Halt never reopened) but were withdrawn entirely two years later on 21 September 1925. Passenger services ran five times a day and used GWR steam rail motors, and the station was run by one man who was also responsible for the level crossing, the signals, and maintaining the gardens.

After the end of regular passenger services, traffic included coal trains, some goods wagons to the mill, and a special train, with covered wagons for luggage, delivered or collected the boys from Monkton School at the beginning and end of school terms.

Closure

The goods services between Limpley Stoke and Camerton continued until Camerton Pit, the last working coal mine in the Cam Valley, ended production in 1950 and the line closed on 15 February 1951.

In 1952, the station was used as "Titfield" station in the Ealing comedy film The Titfield Thunderbolt. Many of the scenes of the village of "Titfield" were shot in the nearby village of Freshford.. The same station location was also used in the 1931 version of The Ghost Train film.

The station was demolished in 1958.

References

Disused railway stations in Bristol, Bath and South Gloucestershire
Former Great Western Railway stations
Railway stations in Great Britain opened in 1910
Railway stations in Great Britain closed in 1915
Railway stations in Great Britain opened in 1923
 Monkton Combe
Railway stations in Great Britain closed in 1925